The World Group was the highest level of Davis Cup competition in 1987.

Australia were the defending champions, but were eliminated in the semifinals.

Sweden won the title, defeating India in the final, 5–0. The final was held at the Scandinavium in Gothenburg, Sweden, from 18 to 20 December. It was the Swedish team's 4th Davis Cup title overall.

Participating teams

Draw

First round

Italy vs. Sweden

France vs. South Korea

Paraguay vs. United States

Spain vs. West Germany

India vs. Argentina

Czechoslovakia vs. Israel

Mexico vs. Great Britain

Australia vs. Yugoslavia

Quarterfinals

France vs. Sweden

Paraguay vs. Spain

India vs. Israel

Australia vs. Mexico

Semifinals

Spain vs. Sweden

Australia vs. India

Final

Sweden vs. India

Relegation play-offs
The first-round losers played in the Relegation Play-offs. The winners of the play-offs advanced to the 1988 Davis Cup World Group, and the losers were relegated to their respective Zonal Regions.

Results summary
Date: 24–26 July

South Korea vs. Italy

United States vs. West Germany

Czechoslovakia vs. Argentina

Yugoslavia vs. Great Britain

References

External links
Davis Cup official website

World Group
Davis Cup World Group
Davis Cup